Camerata Wrocław is a professional chamber orchestra in Wrocław, which was founded in 1998 by the Polish conductor and composer  Jan Pogány. The orchestra performs regularly in Munich, Wrocław and Dresden as well as on regular international tours. The Camerata Wrocław has a repertoire from Bach to film music.

External links
  Official site

String orchestras
Chamber orchestras
Polish orchestras
Musical groups established in 1998